Monkodonja is a hill fort occupied about 1800–1200 BC during the Bronze Age, located near the city of Rovinj in the Croatian region of Istria.

Description

It is located on a hillside surrounded by a spatial area, extending in length from 2.5 km to the sea, and on a cliff at 81 m above sea level, a form of irregular ellipse stretching east-west, 160 m × 250 m. The settlement was surrounded with three concentric walls and two entrances that have explored so far (so called Western and Northern). Not far from the road to the north door there is a pit deep 50 m. The defensive wall surrounding the settlement was about 1 km long, about 3 m wide and at least 3 m tall. It was built by laying stone in the drywall technique. The stone was peeled off the hill, and its removal resulted in a useful surface. Approximately 1,000 people lived in the well-organized settlement: on the highest part was the acropolis, below it the upper town and still lower the lower town. The Acropolis, where the higher layer of communities lived, had a nearly rectilinear space. In other parts of the settlement there was a crafts area. The houses differed with the position, size and manner of construction, and they were separated by passages and streets. Each had a hearth and numerous fragments of pottery pots originated from local workshops, but pots also came from the far east of the eastern Mediterranean. It was the first finding of fragments of Micens (Bronze Age) bowl in Istria. The Monkodonja was an important point in the communications of the northern Adriatic with Central Europe and the Aegean.

Near Monkodonja, a bit E-SE, there's the Monsego hill, where several tumuli from the same time were discovered. So, it is believed that Monsego was Monkodonja's cemetery.

Excavations
It was discovered in 1953. by B. Baćić and B. Marušić. The first research was carried out in 1953-1955. Since 1997, contemporary multidisciplinary international research has been conducted (Archaeological Museum in Pula, Rovinj's Provincial Museum, Freie Universität Berlin).

Gallery

References

External links 

Rovinj virtual guide
Info Rovinj

Bronze Age sites in Europe
Hill forts in Croatia
Megalithic monuments in Europe
Forts in Croatia
Gates
Prehistoric sites in Croatia
Former populated places in the Balkans
Istria